Hyper Sapien: People from Another Star is a 1986 film directed by Peter R. Hunt and starring Dennis Holahan, Ricky Paull Goldin, Sydney Penny, Keenan Wynn (in his final film), and Rosie Marcel.

Plot
One night, three aliens from the planet Taros — a young woman named Robyn, a girl named Tavy, and a furry three-eyed, three-armed creature named Kirbi — stow away on a spaceship headed for Earth, and land near Aladdin, Wyoming. The next morning, the aliens befriend a rancher's son named Dirt while he's out riding fences on his motorcycle. Robyn shows off her bike-riding skills, and the quartet go to visit Dirt's grandparents. After Kirbi beats Grandpa at poker, the creature drinks a can of gasoline. Later, Kirbi keeps feeding the goats even though Grandpa wants him to feed the chickens. Grandpa then shows Kirbi how to shoot Coors cans with a gun while he complains about how much the world has changed. Dirt forms a relationship with Robyn, learning that her hair changes color depending on exposure to sunlight and that she's come from a moonbase and was supposed to go back to her home planet, rather than coming to Earth. Dirt tries to keep his new friends a secret from the rest of his family, but things get complicated when other aliens come looking for the missing trio, Grandpa shows Kirbi to some old folks at the General Store, and a Senator arrives at the ranch for a barbecue.

Cast
Sydney Penny as Robyn
Ricky Paull Goldin as Dirt
Dennis Holahan as Aric
Keenan Wynn as Grandpa
Rosie Marcel as Tavy
Hersha Parady as Mrs. McAlpin
Peter Jason as Mr. McAlpin
Patricia Brookson as Cee Gee 
Talia Shire as Dr. Tedra Rosen
Marilyn Schreffler as the voice of Kirbi

Production
The film was originally going to be directed by Michael Wadleigh (Woodstock, Wolfen), but he dropped out of the project, and Peter R. Hunt took over.

This is the final movie appearance of actor Keenan Wynn, who died two months before the film's release.

The movie takes place in rural Wyoming, and was filmed in and around Calgary, Alberta.

References

External links

1986 films
Films directed by Peter R. Hunt
Films set in Wyoming
Canadian science fiction films
1980s science fiction films
English-language Canadian films
Films shot in Calgary
1980s English-language films
1980s Canadian films
American science fiction films
1980s American films